Paradise Hotel is an American reality television program. In the show, a group of singles live in a luxurious hotel resort, competing to see who can stay in the hotel the longest. Each week, the contestants pair off into couples, and must share a hotel room together. One person is left over, and he or she must either pair up in the following episode, or leave the hotel to be replaced by a new contestant. The format was created by Mentorn, a British production company, which has produced various versions of the show around the world.

The show premiered on Fox in 2003, and was hosted by Amanda Byram. A second season, also hosted by Byram, was broadcast on MyNetworkTV and Fox Reality Channel in 2008. Fox revived Paradise Hotel in 2019, with new host Kristin Cavallari, but Fox cancelled the series again in August 2019.

Episodes

Series overview

Season 1 (2003)

The first season of Paradise Hotel, hosted by Amanda Byram, aired on Fox from June 18 to October 1, 2003, and consists of thirty episodes. The winners of the first season were Charla Pihlstrom and Keith Cuda, with Dave Kerpen and Tara Gerard finishing as runners-up. Charla and Keith had to decide whether to split their $250,000 prize with their respective partners – Keith decided to share his winnings with Tara, while Charla chose to keep the money for herself and give Dave nothing.

Season 2 (2008)

A second season, titled Paradise Hotel 2, began airing on February 4, 2008, on the Fox-owned networks MyNetworkTV and Fox Reality Channel. It consists of sixteen episodes and a reunion special. Amanda Byram returned as host, and Mark Thompson returned as announcer.

New episodes aired on MyNetworkTV Monday nights at 9 p.m., and repeated Saturday nights at 9 p.m. Fox Reality Channel aired more explicit, TV-MA versions of the episodes, at 1 a.m. on the same night that they premiered on MyNetworkTV, and repeated these episodes throughout the following week.

Stephanie and Zack were the winners, but the runners-up, Tidisha and Ryan, were given the responsibility of choosing only one member of the winning couple to claim the "ultimate prize". They chose Zack, who was awarded $200,000. He chose to share $20,000 with Tidisha and $90,000 with Stephanie, keeping the remaining $90,000 for himself.

Season 3 (2019)

In 2019, Fox ordered a revival of the series. Casting began in January, and Kristin Cavallari was chosen as the new host. The third season premiered on May 9, 2019. The revival's season was truncated, with its season finale airing on June 6, 2019. The winners as chosen by a jury of the other former contestants were Bobby Ray and Tatum, beating Carlos and Kaitlin, but in the final twist Bobby Ray chose to keep $200,000 of the prize for himself, leaving Tatum with nothing. The revival was officially canceled by Fox in August 2019.

International versions

Despite being only a modest success in the United States, the Paradise Hotel franchise has been described as "an international hit", spawning versions in eighteen countries.

See also

Forever Eden
Love Island
Temptation Island
Love in the Wild
Bachelor in Paradise

Note

References

External links
 
 Paradise Hotel at Fox 
 Paradise Hotel 2 at Fox Reality 
 Paradise Hotel 2 at MyNetworkTV
 
 Zap2it: Contestant Dave Reflects Back On Show
 Boracay Paradise Hotels Directory

2000s American reality television series
2010s American reality television series
2003 American television series debuts
2019 American television series endings
American dating and relationship reality television series
American television series revived after cancellation
Fox Broadcasting Company original programming
MyNetworkTV original programming
Television shows set in Mexico